Bulbophyllum sect. Minutissima is a section of the genus Bulbophyllum.

Description
Species in this section have a single flower.

Distribution
Plants from this section are found in Southeast asia and Australia.

Species
Bulbophyllum section  Minutissima comprises the following species:

References

Orchid subgenera